Carlos Alberto Schneeberger Lemp (21 June 1902 – 1 October 1973) was a Chilean football attacker. He was born in Lautaro, and died, aged 71, in Temuco. He was part of Chile's team at the 1928 Summer Olympics.

References

External links

1902 births
1973 deaths
Chilean people of German descent
Chilean footballers
Chile international footballers
Colo-Colo footballers
Club de Deportes Green Cross footballers
1930 FIFA World Cup players
People from Lautaro
Association football forwards
Olympic footballers of Chile
Footballers at the 1928 Summer Olympics